Emel Ecem Güler (born 16 January 1992 in Soma, Turkey) is a Turkish basketball player. She plays for Fenerbahçe İstanbul as both small and power forward position. She is 187 cm tall and 75 kg weights. She has played for Fenerbahçe İstanbul since 2004 in youth level and since 2010 in senior level.

Honors
Turkish Championship (3): 2010-11, 2011–12, 2012–13
Turkish Presidents Cup (1): 2010

See also
 Turkish women in sports

External links
Player Profile at fenerbahce.org
Player Profile at fibaeurope.com

1992 births
Living people
Turkish women's basketball players
Fenerbahçe women's basketball players
Forwards (basketball)
People from Soma, Manisa
Sportspeople from Manisa
21st-century Turkish sportswomen